Erica Rose (born April 6, 1983) is an American lawyer, and reality TV personality known for her roles in the American TV series The Bachelor, Bachelor Pad, Below Deck Sailing Yacht and You're Cut Off!.

Early life and career 
Erica Rose was born in Houston, Texas, United States, and attended The Kinkaid School and graduated from Emory University where she graduated with a dual major in English and Creative Writing and a minor in Theater. While attending Emory, Rose was a member of the Alpha Epsilon Phi and was the sports editor and a staff writer for The Emory Wheel.

In 2012, she received a Doctor of Jurisprudence degree from University of Houston Law Center. also has an LLM degree in Entertainment and Media Law from the Southwestern Law School in California. Rose founded the Rose Sanders Law Firm, a Texas based family law and personal injury law firm.

Personal life 
On December 3, 2017, after only three months of being engaged, she married Charles "Chuck" Sanders, whom she met in high school before her reality TV career started.

Erica and Charles lavish wedding featured Erica's friends and colleagues from the Bachelor Franchise; including,  including Vienna Girardi, Tara Durr and her husband John Presser, Cory Shivar, Melissa Schreiber, Renee Simlak, Jeannette Pawula, AshLee Frazier Williams and even Prince Lorenzo Borghese who was the Bachelor on Erica's season. Erica and Charles have a daughter named Aspen Rose Sanders. Erica also has a daughter from a previous relationship named Holland Rose Madeleine.

Reality TV career 
Rose made her reality TV debut in 2006 as a contestant on the 9th season of The Bachelor.
 
In 2010, Rose debuted on the TV series You're Cut Off!. The series focused on nine wealthy women who were told they were going to be featured on a fake television production called The Good Life. However, they were later told that their families had "cut them off" from their spending money, and that they were participating in an eight-week program, which introduced them to a simpler lifestyle.

In 2011, Rose debuted on the TV series Bachelor Pad. She was the subject of controversy as a result of the series involving an episode where eggs where thrown at her in a challenge on an episode of Bachelor Pad season 3.

Rose recalled a notable challenge she said was both emotionally traumatic and physically hurtful: "Target on Your Back." The challenge involved the men and then the women lining up blindfolded in either swim trunks or bikinis. With their backs turned, each member of the other group was given a question and tasked with answering by throwing a paint-filled egg at whichever contestant was their answer to the question. They received a point if they hit their target and the person with the most points won.

In 2021, Rose debuted on the TV series Below Deck Sailing Yacht. Rose appeared on season two with her friends.  In 2022, Rose reappeared in season three alongside her husband, family and friends. Erica and Chuck's charter left a $6500 tip after criticizing chef Marcos Spaziani's food. Chuck complained that McDonald's tasted better than the chef's preparation. Some considered Erica and Chuck to be "the worst guests in Below Deck Sailing Yacht history."

Filmography

References 

1983 births
Emory University alumni
Living people
Participants in American reality television series
Texas lawyers
University of Houston Law Center alumni